Norbert Sander (August 21, 1942 - March 17, 2017) was an American physician and runner who won the New York City Marathon in 1974. He has been described as "one of the most influential track and field figures in the city's history."

Dr. Norbert Sander remains the only male New Yorker to win the New York City Marathon. He prevailed when the 26.2-mile event was held in Central Park, two years before it became the five-borough race it is today. More than a decade later, while practicing family medicine in the Bronx, Sander came across the Armory, a formerly famed indoor track and field facility in the Washington Heights neighborhood where he raced as a boy.

The Fort Washington Avenue Armory facility had become a “dilapidated, overcrowded homeless shelter” in the 1980s, according to the New York Road Runners. There were about 2,000 homeless men housed in unsanitary conditions. Every window was broken, according to Fordham Preparatory School, from which Sander graduated in 1960.Sander, as president, CEO and founder of the Armory Foundation, helped the homeless relocate to better living conditions. He lobbied city corporations and athletic companies to raise money to restore the Armory. Efforts by those including Sander netted $25 million to restore the building, according to Fordham Prep. Track and field competition returned to the Armory in 1993 after a seven-year hiatus, according to The New York Times. Now, it’s a national historic landmark, houses the National Track and Field Hall of Fame and hosts the Millrose Games every February, arguably the most prestigious annual indoor track and field meet. The Millrose Games feature not only Olympic and world champions, but also youth and high school races.

In 2014, Sander received the Abebe Bikila Award from the New York Road Runners for his “outstanding commitment and contributions to the sport of distance running.” The award was named after the Ethiopian marathoner who became the first sub-Saharan African to win an Olympic gold medal. “Dr. Sander was a partner to USATF who cared passionately about the sport and even more about the kids who benefit from the Armory’s track and field, educational and enrichment programs,” USA Track and Field CEO Max Siegel said in a statement. “Countless young people have been impacted by his work.

References

External links
 Norbert Sander at Association of Road Racing Statisticians

20th-century American physicians
American male marathon runners
New York City Marathon male winners
Fordham Preparatory School alumni
Fordham University alumni